Concesio (locally ) is a town and comune in the province of Brescia, in Lombardy in Trompia valley. Concesio is located in the lower Val Trompia, at the foot of Monte Spina. The comune is bounded by other communes of Brescia, Bovezzo, Lumezzane, Villa Carcina, Gussago and Collebeato.

It is the birthplace of Giovanni Battista Montini, who was Pope (1963–78) under the name of Paul VI.

Notable people
 Giovanni Battista Montini (1897), became Pope Paul VI
 Mario Balotelli (1990), footballer

Sources

Pope Paul VI
Cities and towns in Lombardy